"Chica Bomb" is a song co-written and recorded by the Moldovan dance musician Dan Balan featuring uncredited vocals from American recording artist Katie DiCicco. It was released in April 2010 as his second single.

Reception
Nick Levine of Digital Spy gave the song a positive review stating:

It's by the guy behind T.I. and RiRi's favourite Eurodance smash, it's got a video that could accurately be subtitled "Jiggly Sweaty Boobs", and its title is a cringey slither of Spanglish that translates as "Young Girl Bomb". However, like a fondue made with Tesco Value mild cheddar, this isn't as cheesy as it should be.

In fact, "Chica Bomb" is a sleek and reasonably sexy electro-house track with a nice bit of synthy bounce to it. It's not terribly original, of course, and the lyrics aren't worth cutting and pasting, but fair's fair; the hook doesn't miss explosive by much. The result? David Guetta may not have anything to worry about, but Britain's irked clubbers certainly do.

Following the official music video's release in 2010, a remix of the song with Balan and his vocals removed  titled "Chica Boom (Females Only)" was produced, receiving almost 1.9 million views. (The original was removed but there is another version up.) There are also quite a few remixes with a different refrain (variously titled). The dancers' names: Ashley Schultz (table), Mayra Munoz (headphones), Britten Kelley (black lingerie), and Jennifer Humphrey (pink/on bed).

Track listing

Charts

See also
 List of Romanian Top 100 number ones of the 2000s

References

2010 singles
2010 songs
Dan Balan songs
Number-one singles in Romania
Number-one singles in Russia
Songs written by Dan Balan